Grace Winifred Green (13 February 1907 – 25 May 1976) was a New Zealand radio broadcaster and journalist. She was born in Christchurch, New Zealand on 13 February 1907.

She is buried at Ruru Lawn Cemetery in Christchurch.

References

1907 births
1976 deaths
People from Christchurch
Burials at Ruru Lawn Cemetery
New Zealand women journalists
20th-century New Zealand women writers
20th-century New Zealand journalists